Rundsporthalle is an indoor sporting arena located in Ludwigsburg, Germany.  The capacity of the arena is 3,008 people.  It was the home to the EnBW Ludwigsburg basketball team prior to the Arena Ludwigsburg opened in the year 2009.

References

Indoor arenas in Germany
Sports venues in Baden-Württemberg
Buildings and structures in Ludwigsburg